Before the Rain may refer to:

Before the Rain (1994 film), 1994 film by Milčo Mančevski — a drama with Balkan wars in the background 
Before the Rain (album), 1997 album by Eternal
Before the Rain (2010 film), 2010 film written by Shirley Barrett, a hot day in Sydney 
"Before the Rain", harmonica piece by Lee Oskar
"Before the Rain", a 2010 song by Duran Duran from their album All You Need Is Now

See also
Before the Rains, a 2007 Indian-British film